Cornelius Heinrich Dretzel (18 September 1697 (bapt.) – 7 May 1775) was a German organist and composer. He was born in Nuremberg, where he appears to have spent his whole life in various organists' posts, including:
 St. Egidien, Nuremberg 1719–1743
 St. Lorenz, Nuremberg 1743–1764
 St. Sebaldus Church, Nuremberg 1764–1775

He may have studied with J.S. Bach in Weimar (1716–1717), and his compositions reveal points of contact with Bach. They include a concerto for harpsichord solo, perhaps modelled on the Italian Concerto.

References

Sources
 
 Oxford Composer Companions, J.S. Bach, 1999, p. 142

Further reading
  – reviews speculation that J.S. Bach did not compose the work.

External links
 

German Baroque composers
Musicians from Nuremberg
1697 births
1775 deaths
18th-century classical composers
German classical composers
German male classical composers
18th-century German composers
18th-century German male musicians